Louise Guillet (born 31 January 1986 Limoges) is a French water polo player.

Life 

She was captain of the France women's national water polo team at the 2017 World Aquatics Championships. and  2018 Women's European Water Polo Championship.

References

External links 

 Louise Guillet : "Prises en otage par ce conflit"
Lille, the beginning of a long reign?

1986 births
Living people
French female water polo players
People from Limoges
21st-century French women